This is a summary of 1971 in music in the United Kingdom, including the official charts from that year.

Events
3 February - Davy Jones announces he is leaving the Monkees
1 March – Bassist John Deacon joins Queen
4 March – The Rolling Stones open their UK tour in Newcastle upon Tyne, intended as a "farewell" to the UK prior to the band's relocation to France as "tax exiles".
5 March – Ulster Hall, Belfast, Northern Ireland, sees the first live performance of Led Zeppelin's iconic song "Stairway to Heaven".
6 April – The Rolling Stones hold a party in Cannes to officially announce their new contract with Atlantic and the launch of Rolling Stones Records.
12 May – Mick Jagger marries Bianca de Macías in Saint-Tropez, France, in a Roman Catholic ceremony. Paul McCartney, Ringo Starr, and their wives are among the wedding guests.
16 May - BBC television makes the first broadcast of Benjamin Britten's opera for television, Owen Wingrave.
20-24 June – The first Glastonbury Festival to take place at the summer solstice is held in South West England. Performers include David Bowie, Traffic, Fairport Convention, Quintessence and Hawkwind.
19–24 July - Benjamin Britten conducts recording of Edward Elgar's The Dream of Gerontius at Snape Maltings.
1 August - The Concert for Bangladesh at Madison Square Garden, New York, starring Ravi Shankar, George Harrison, Ringo Starr, Bob Dylan, and Leon Russell; also featuring Billy Preston, Eric Clapton, Jesse Ed Davis, and Badfinger.
14 August - The Who release their fifth studio album Who's Next, reaching No. 1 in the UK and No. 1 in the US.
8 November – Led Zeppelin release their officially untitled fourth studio album, which would become the band's biggest-selling album.

Number Ones

Singles

Albums

Year-end charts

Best-selling singles

(Covering 16th Jan to 18th Dec 1971)
 "My Sweet Lord" - George Harrison 890,000
 "Maggie May/Reason to Believe" - Rod Stewart 615,000 in total
 "Chirpy Chirpy Cheep Cheep" - Middle of the Road 614,000 in total
 "Knock Three Times" - Dawn 531,500
 "Hot Love" - T. Rex 530,000
 "The Pushbike Song" - The Mixtures 500,000
 "Never Ending Song of Love" - The New Seekers 421,000
 "I'm Still Waiting" - Diana Ross 420,000
 "Hey Girl Don't Bother Me" - The Tams 415,000
 "Get It On" - T-Rex 413,000
 "Coz I Luv You" - Slade 410,000
 "Amazing Grace" - Judy Collins 405,000
 "Grandad" - Clive Dunn 400,000
 "Double Barrel" - Dave and Ansil Collins 395,000
 "Rose Garden" - Lynn Anderson 394,000
 "Baby Jump" - Mungo Jerry 388,000
 "Did You Ever" - Nancy Sinatra & Lee Hazlewood 370,000
 "For All We Know" - Shirley Bassey 362,000
 "Brown Sugar" - The Rolling Stones 360,000
 "Stoned Love" - The Supremes 355,000
 "Co-Co" - Sweet 354,000
 "It's Impossible" - Perry Como 351,000
 "Ernie (The Fastest Milkman in the West)" - Benny Hill 350,000
 "Resurrection Shuffle" - Ashton, Gardner & Dyke 345,000
 "Another Day" - Paul McCartney 344,000
 "The Witch Queen of New Orleans" - Redbone 340,000
 "Tweedle Dee Tweedle Dum" - Middle of the Road 336,000
 "I Did What I Did for Maria" - Tony Christie 335,000
 "Bridget the Midget" - Ray Stevens 335,000
 "The Banner Man" - Blue Mink 331,000
 "Till" - Tom Jones 330,000
 "You've Got a Friend" - James Taylor 326,000
 "Mozart 40" - Waldo De Los Rios 325,000
 "Jeepster" - T-Rex 325,000
 "Indiana Wants Me" - R. Dean Taylor 324,000
 "I'm Gonna Run Away from You" - Tami Lynn 322,000
 "Don't Let It Die" - Hurricane Smith 320,000
 "He's Gonna Step On You Again" - John Kongos 315,000
 "Back Street Luv" - Curved Air 310,000
 "Tom Tom Turnaround" - New World 305,000
 "What are You Doing Sunday" - Dawn 300,000
 "It Don't Come Easy" - Ringo Starr 295,000
 "Me and You and a Dog Named Boo" - Lobo 295,000
 "In My Own Time" - Family 285,000
 "Johnny Reggae" - The Piglets 284,000
 "No Matter What" - Badfinger 282,000
 "Gypsies, Tramps and Thieves" - Cher 281,0000
 "I Believe (In Love)" - Hot Chocolate 280,000
 "The Devil’s Answer" - Atomic Rooster 265,000
 "Banks of the Ohio" - Olivia Newton-John 260,000

Best-selling albums
The list of the top fifty best-selling albums of 1971 were published in Record Mirror at the end of the year, and later reproduced in the first edition of the BPI Year Book in 1976. However, in 2007 the Official Charts Company published album chart histories for each year from 1956 to 1977, researched by historian Sharon Mawer, and included an updated list of the top ten best-selling albums for each year based on the new research. The updated top ten for 1971 is shown in the table below.

Classical music: new works
Benjamin Britten - Cello Suite No. 3

Film and Incidental music
John Barry - 
Diamonds Are Forever, starring Sean Connery.
Mary, Queen of Scots, starring Vanessa Redgrave and Glenda Jackson.
Walkabout directed by Nicolas Roeg, starring Jenny Agutter.
Richard Rodney Bennett - Nicholas and Alexandra.
Roy Budd - Get Carter, starring Michael Caine.

Births
8 January – Karen Poole (Alisha's Attic)
11 January - Tom Rowlands (Chemical Brothers)
13 January – Lee Agnew (Nazareth)
20 January - Gary Barlow, singer-songwriter (Take That)
2 February - Michelle Gayle, actress and singer
13 February – Sonia, singer
16 February - Steven Houghton, actor and singer
6 March – Betty Boo, singer
26 March – John Hendy, singer (East 17)
31 March – Ewan McGregor, actor and singer
9 May – Paul McGuigan bassist (Oasis)
14 May – Matthew Pateman, singer (Bad Boys Inc)
17 May – Vernie Bennett, singer (Eternal)
31 May – Adam Walton, DJ
4 June - Tony McCarroll, drummer (Oasis)
30 June - Bastiaan Ragas, Dutch-born singer (Caught in the Act)
14 July – Nick McCabe, English guitarist (The Verve and Black Submarine)
11 September – Richard Ashcroft, singer and songwriter (The Verve)
21 September – Jimmy Constable, singer (911)
18 October - Mark Morriss, singer (The Bluetones)
30 October – John Alford, singer and actor
5 November – Jonny Greenwood, musician, songwriter and composer
19 November – Justin Chancellor, musician (Tool, Peach)
21 November – Karen Ramirez, singer
25 December – Dido, singer

Deaths
11 January – Irene Scharrer, pianist, 82
1 February – Harry Roy, bandleader, 71
6 March – Thurston Dart, harpsichordist and conductor, 49
30 March - Harold Craxton, pianist and composer, 85
21 May - Dennis King, actor and singer, 73
11 June – Ambrose, bandleader and violinist, 74
16 June - Ellaline Terriss, actress and singer, 100

See also 
 1971 in British radio
 1971 in British television
 1971 in the United Kingdom
 List of British films of 1971

References 

 
British
British music by year